Muhammad Sameh Abdel Rahman (born 5 October 1943) is an Egyptian former foil fencer. He competed at the 1960 and 1964 Summer Olympics. At the 1960 Games, he represented the United Arab Republic.

References

External links
 

1943 births
Living people
Egyptian male foil fencers
Olympic fencers of Egypt
Fencers at the 1960 Summer Olympics
Fencers at the 1964 Summer Olympics
Sportspeople from Cairo